Belsize Fire Station is a former fire station that is now used for private housing. Built between 1912 and 1915, it is a Grade II* listed building, and is situated in the London Borough of Camden.

History
Belsize Fire Station was designed by the architects Charles Winmill and Owen Fleming on behalf of London County Council, and built between 1912 and 1915 to replace a previous fire station in St John's Wood. It is built in Arts and Crafts style, in the style of an artist's studio. The building is made of brick with a flint roof, and contains glazed brick arches. The original building contained one bedroom apartments used to house firefighters, as well as a recreation room and separate billiard room.

In 1974 it became a Grade II* listed building. The Fire Station was in London Fire Brigade zone A, which went as far as Westminster and Hammersmith. Fire crews from Belsize Fire Station were involved in the aftermath of the 1987 King's Cross fire, the 7 July 2005 London bombings, and a 2012 fire in the Taplow Block of flats.

The fire station was closed in 2014; it was one of nine fire stations in Greater London closed in that year due to budget cuts. In 2015, the building was sold for £20 million to an unknown buyer. In 2017, planning permission was given to convert Belsize Fire Station into 18 private flats, two of which had to be used for social housing. The social housing requirement was abandoned in 2020, and the building is now used for energy-efficient luxury flats. The price of the flats ranged from £750,000 to £1.7 million.

References

Grade II* listed buildings in the London Borough of Camden
Fire stations completed in 1915
Defunct fire stations
Arts and Crafts architecture in London
Belsize Park
Swiss Cottage
Grade II* listed houses in London
Grade II* listed fire stations
Fire stations in the United Kingdom